Magen Abraham may refer to:

 Magen Abraham Synagogue, in Ahmedabad, India
 Avraham Gombiner, a 17th-century rabbi known as Magen Avraham

See also
 Maghen Abraham (disambiguation)